The Diocese of Limerick (Irish: Deoise Luimnigh) is a Roman Catholic diocese in mid-western Ireland, one of six suffragan dioceses in the ecclesiastical province of Cashel and Emly.

The cathedral church of the diocese is St John's Cathedral in Limerick.

The incumbent bishop of the diocese is Brendan Leahy.

Geography
The diocese is divided into 60 parishes, which are spread across three counties: 57 in Limerick, 18 of which are in the Limerick city area, two in Clare, and one between Limerick and Kerry.

The parishes are grouped into 16 Pastoral Units, where groups of priests are appointed to cover a number of parishes between them.

As of 2018, there were 65 priests in active ministry, 27 of whom were over the age of 65.

Aside from the cathedral city of Limerick, the main towns in the diocese are Abbeyfeale, Adare, Kilmallock, Newcastle West, and Rathkeale.

Ordinaries

The following is a list of the ten most recent bishops: 
 Charles Tuohy (1814–1828)
 John Ryan (1828–1864)
 George Butler (1864–1886)
 Edward Thomas O'Dwyer (1886–1917)
 Denis Hallinan (1918–1923)
 David Keane (1923–1945)
 Patrick O'Neill (1945–1958)
 Henry Murphy (1958–1973)
 Jeremiah Newman (1974–1995)
 Donal Murray (1996–2009)
 Sede vacante (2009–2013)
 Brendan Leahy (2013–present)

See also
 Catholic Church in Ireland
Church of Ireland Diocese of Limerick and Killaloe

External links
 Official Diocesan website
 GCatholic
Catholic Hierarchy
 Catholic Encyclopedia Profile
Pastoral Unit List

References

 
Roman Catholic Ecclesiastical Province of Cashel